Labastide-de-Penne is a commune in the Tarn-et-Garonne department in the Occitania region in Southern France. In 2019, it had a population of 128.

Labastide-de-Penne is located on the departmental border with Lot, in which it neighbours the communes of Lalbenque, Belfort-du-Quercy and Belmont-Sainte-Foi. In Tarn-et-Garonne, it neighbours Puylaroque.

See also
Communes of the Tarn-et-Garonne department

References

Communes of Tarn-et-Garonne